Radhika is an 2022 Indian-Kannada language Family drama which premiered on Udaya TV on 14 March 2022. The show is an official remake of Tamil serial Kayal. It stars Kavya Shastry and Sharath Kshatriya in lead roles.

Cast

Main
Kavya Shastry as Radhika
Sharath Kshatriya as Chiranth

Supporting
 Ravikumar as Kariappa
 Malathi Sirdeshpande as Janaki
 Suresh Rai
 Savitha Krishnamurthy
 Shwetha Rao / Supriya Rao as Sunayana 
 Sunil as Kashi 
 Jeevan / Praveen as Kalki
 Rekha Sagar
 Inchara Shetty as Gamya
 Priya Darshini as Ramya 
 Dhriya Adithya
 Murthy as Vignesh
 Rekha Das as Rajeshwari

Production

Casting
Nandini serial fame Kavya Shastry was cast in the female lead role as Radhika and Sharath Kshatriya was cast in the male lead role as Chiranth.

Adaptations

References

2022 Indian television series debuts
Udaya TV original programming
Kannada-language television shows
Kannada-language television series based on Tamil-language television series